Hu Qing (born January 19, 1986) is a male amateur boxer from China. He competed at the 2006 Asian Games in the lightweight (- 60 kg) division winning the gold medal in the match against Mongolia's Uranchimegiin Mönkh-Erdene.

At the World Championships he lost his first match to Olexandr Klyuchko 13:26. He qualified for the 2008 Summer Olympics by beating Bekzod Khidirov. At the Olympics, he upset Ukrainian Oleksandr Klyuchko 10:8 and beat Kazakh Merey Akshalov 11:7 before losing to Frenchman Daouda Sow 6:9.

References

External links
 Olympic qualification
 

1986 births
Living people
Boxers at the 2008 Summer Olympics
Olympic boxers of China
Asian Games medalists in boxing
Sportspeople from Anhui
People from Lu'an
Boxers at the 2006 Asian Games
Boxers at the 2010 Asian Games
Chinese male boxers
Asian Games gold medalists for China
Asian Games silver medalists for China
Medalists at the 2006 Asian Games
Medalists at the 2010 Asian Games
Lightweight boxers
21st-century Chinese people